This is a summary of 2001 in music in the United Kingdom.

Events
13 February – Peter Frampton receives the Orville H. Gibson Lifetime Achievement Award.
17 February – Manic Street Preachers become the first western rock band to play in Cuba. (Fidel Castro is in attendance.) They did not tour, meaning that an unsigned British rock band, Sandstone Veterans, remain the only band from the western world to tour Cuba.
8 March – Melanie C announces she does not intend to do any more work with the Spice Girls. Although the group denies it is splitting, it would not be active again until 2007.
26 March – Damon Albarn's project Gorillaz releases their eponymous debut studio album, which would sell over seven million copies worldwide by 2007, earning them an entry in the Guinness Book of World Records as the Most Successful Virtual Band.
28 March – Sergei Rachmaninoff's Piano Concerto No. 2 replaces Max Bruch's violin concerto at #1 in the Classic FM Hall of Fame.
4 April – Original Zombies lead singer Colin Blunstone and keyboardist Rod Argent reunite for a two-part performance at London's Jazz Cafe, the first time the two had performed together in over 30 years.
16 June – Romanian tenor Marius Brenciu becomes the first performer to win both the main prize and the song prize in the BBC Cardiff Singer of the World competition.
2 July – Liverpool Airport is rechristened Liverpool John Lennon Airport in an official ceremony.
21 September – Welsh band Catatonia split up amicably, and after Cerys Matthews' treatment in rehab for alcohol and smoking problems.
1 November – The governing body of the UK Singles Chart, Chart Information Network Ltd. (CIN), changes its name to The Official UK Charts Company.
4 December – Promoters for So Solid Crew cancel their then planned tour – after a shooting at a gig at the London Astoria on 4 November, which saw two men hospitalised.

Classical music

Summary
Russell Watson came to the fore in 2001, with the release of his best-selling album The Voice.  Another hit album was the score from Captain Corelli's Mandolin by Stephen Warbeck.  Karl Jenkins "mass for peace", entitled The Armed Man, went quickly into the Classic FM top 300 annual chart, making him the highest-placed living composer.

Works
Robat Arwyn – Atgof o'r Sêr
Peter Maxwell Davies – Symphony No. 8 (Antarctic Symphony)
Howard Goodall – In Memoriam Anne Frank
Christopher Gunning – Piano Concerto
John McCabe – Woman by the Sea (piano, string quartet)
Stuart Mitchell – Seven Wonders Suite for Choir & Orchestra
Hilary Tann – The Grey Tide and the Green

Opera
Julian Wagstaff – John Paul Jones

Albums
Karl Jenkins – Adiemus IV: The Eternal Knot
Julian Lloyd Webber – Celebration
Russell Watson – The Voice

Musical films
Strictly Sinatra, directed by Peter Capaldi, starring Ian Hart

Film scores and incidental music
John Barry – Enigma
Patrick Doyle 
Bridget Jones's Diary
Gosford Park
John PowellEvolutionRat RaceI Am SamStephen Warbeck Captain Corelli's MandolinCharlotte GrayMusic awards

BRIT Awards
The 2001 BRIT Awards winners were:

Best soundtrack: "American Beauty"British album: Coldplay – "Parachutes"British breakthrough act: a1
British dance act: Fatboy Slim
British female solo artist: Sonique
British group: Coldplay
British male solo artist: Robbie Williams
British single: Robbie Williams – "Rock DJ"
British video: Robbie Williams – "Rock DJ"
International breakthrough act: Kelis
International female: Madonna
International group: U2
International male: Eminem
Outstanding contribution: U2
Pop act: Westlife

Mercury Music Prize
The 2001 Mercury Music Prize was awarded to PJ Harvey – Stories from the City, Stories from the Sea''.

Record of the Year
The Record of the Year was awarded to "Don't Stop Movin'" by S Club 7.

Deaths
4 January – Lawrence Leonard, cellist, conductor and composer, 77
21 February – Ronnie Hilton, singer, 75
9 April – Ken Rattenbury, jazz trumpeter, pianist and composer, 80
11 April – Sir Harry Secombe, entertainer, 79
29 April – Rita Hunter, operatic soprano, 67
6 May – Mike Hazlewood, singer, composer and songwriter, 59 (heart attack)
21 May – Tony Ashton, keyboardist, singer and composer, 55 (cancer)
25 May – Delme Bryn-Jones, operatic baritone, 67 
12 June - Thomas Wilson, composer, 83
19 June – Lindsay L. Cooper, musician, 61
3 July - Delia Derbyshire, electronic musician and composer, 64 
12 July – James Bernard, film composer, 75
22 July – Emmanuel Fisher, conductor and composer, 79
24 October – Kim Gardner, musician, 53
16 November – Rosemary Brown, composer, pianist and spiritualist, 85
31 October – Bill Le Sage, jazz pianist, 74
28 November – Norman Lumsden, opera singer and actor, 95
29 November – George Harrison, singer, musician, music and film producer, 58
16 December – Stuart Adamson, guitarist with Big Country, 43 (suicide)
18 December – Clifford T. Ward, singer-songwriter, 57

References

External links

 
British music by year